The Man from Independence is a 1974 biographical–drama film directed by Jack Smight and written by Edward DeBlasio. The film stars Robert Vaughn, Arthur Kennedy, Martha Scott, June Dayton, Russell Johnson, Ronne Troup, Alan Fudge, and Tasha Lee.

Plot
The film tells the story of Harry S. Truman as he begins his political career in 1929.

Cast
 Robert Vaughn as Harry S. Truman
 Arthur Kennedy as Tom Pendergast
 Martha Scott as Mamma Truman
 June Dayton as Bess Truman
 Russell Johnson as Linaver
 Ronne Troup as Constance
 Alan Fudge as Mooney
 Tasha Lee as Margaret Truman
 James Luisi as Stranger
 Lou Frizzell as Quilling
 Leonard Stone as Werner
 Michael Vandever as Lorenzo Dayton
 Alice Backes as Teacher
 Jay Virela as Pete

Book
The Man from Independence was written into a book as Harry S. Truman: The Man from Independence by Karin Clafford Farley in July 1989.

See also
 List of American films of 1974

References

Sources

External links

1974 films
Films directed by Jack Smight
Cultural depictions of Harry S. Truman
Films about Harry Truman
1970s English-language films
1970s American films